The PBA World Championship is one of five major PBA (Professional Bowlers Association) bowling events. It is one of three PBA Tour major events that are open only to PBA members. (The U.S. Open and USBC Masters allow qualifying amateurs to enter.)

Prior to 2002, the tournament was called the PBA National Championship. The PBA National Championship was first contested on November 28, 1960, then called the First Annual National Championship; the winner was PBA Hall of Famer Don Carter. Tournament champions currently win the Earl Anthony Trophy, named in honor of the late PBA legend who won this title a record six times (1973–75 and 1981–83). The World Championship has occasionally offered a $100,000 top prize, and as much as $150,000 in 2020.

Background
The National Championship and World Championship have been contested over the years using a variety of formats.  Currently, the PBA World Championship format is different from normal PBA Tour events.  Since the 2009–10 season, the initial qualifying scores for the World Championship have come from other stand-alone tournaments at the PBA World Series of Bowling, which celebrated its 13th anniversary in 2022. Thus, the current tournament is open to any PBA member who also enters the World Series of Bowling.

For the 2009–10 season, the PBA World Championship was part of the World Series of Bowling held in Allen Park, Michigan, and was contested in a split format.  The qualifying rounds of the tournament were contested August 31 – September 4, with the televised finals being broadcast live on ESPN December 13, 2009. The PBA's second World Series of Bowling in 2010 was contested in Las Vegas, Nevada, and was again used as qualifying for the 2010–11 PBA World Championship. This time, the 60-game qualifying scores for the five "animal pattern" championships held at the World Series were used to determine the 8-bowler TV field for the PBA World Championship finals.  The World Championship finals were televised live over three consecutive days (January 14–16, 2011), a PBA first.

Currently (as of the 2021 WSOB XII), combined scores from the 30 games of qualifying (10 games each) on three different animal oil patterns determine the top 30 for the cashers round of the PBA World Championship. These 30 players then bowl ten more games (two five-game blocks) on the Earl Anthony 43 oil pattern, which is named after the six-time winner of this event. The cashers field is subsequently cut to 16 players for two eight-game, roundrobin match play rounds. Total pinfall from all 56 qualifying games, including 30 bonus pins for head-to-head match play wins, determines the five players that advance to the televised finals. The Earl Anthony 43 oil pattern is also used for the match play and championship rounds.

World Champions

2022 event
The 2022 Guaranteed Rate PBA World Championship was contested March 7–11 at Bowlero Wauwatosa in Wauwatosa, Wisconsin, with a live televised stepladder final on March 13. The tournament had 96 entries and a $428,800 prize fund. The top 33 players cashed, with the champion earning $100,000.

Top seed Kristopher Prather defeated No. 4 seed Jason Sterner in the final match. After the two players tied at 237 in the regulation ten frames, Prather topped Sterner 10–6 in a one-ball sudden death roll-off. This was Prather's fifth PBA Tour title and second major championship.

Prize Pool:
1. Kristopher Prather (Plainfield, Illinois) – $100,000
2. Jason Sterner (Rochester, New York) – $55,000
3. Tommy Jones (Simpsonville, South Carolina) – $40,000
4. Jason Belmonte (Orange, New South Wales, Australia) – $30,000
5. Jakob Butturff (Tempe, Arizona) – $25,000

Past winners

+ Due to the 2012–13 "Super Season" running from November 2012 to December 2013, there were two PBA World Championship events: one in November 2012 and one in November 2013.

References

External links
 PBA.com site

Ten-pin bowling competitions in the United States